Beyarslania is a genus of braconid wasps in the family Braconidae. There is at least one described species in Beyarslania, B. insolens, found in Africa.

References

Microgastrinae